Sophoradin is an isoprenyl chalconoid, a type of polyphenolic compound, found in Sophora tonkinensis, an herb used in traditional Chinese medicine.

Sofalcone is an oral gastrointestinal medication and a synthetic analog of sophoradin.

References

Chalconoids